Arintaraj 26 is the tier 1 police tactical unit of the Royal Thai Police (RTP).

Introduction 

Arintaraj 26 or Anti-Terrorism Sub-Division placed under the control and responsibility of the Patrol and Special Operation Division, Metropolitan Police Bureau are responsible in Bangkok area and other urban areas nearby Bangkok. Like the tactical units of other countries, the squad specializes in capture high-value target, counterterrorism, engaging heavily-armed criminals, executive protection, hostage rescue, protecting high-level meeting areas, high-risk law enforcement situations, supporting crowd control operations during confession plans or meeting, tactical emergency medical services, and serving high-risk arrest and search warrants; subduing barricaded suspects.

History 

In 1977 there were incidents of unrest in Thailand of an unusual nature including serious crimes and international terrorism. Pol.Col. Chumpon Attasat Superintendent of the Riot Control and Suppression Sub-Division had established a special operation unit called "Anti-Hijacker". He has selected police officers within the unit who were physically, mentally, and intellectually ready to the specified qualifications to attend the training in order to cater to missions of the international nature. During the training,  there was no financial support not even for the meals of the attendees. Therefore, participants joined in this training with their hearts and ideologies. After Pol.Col.Chumpon Attasit was assigned to take a position in a different unit the special operation had changed. 

In 1983 There was an international terrorism incident and insurgency in Thailand, particularly in Bangkok. Pol.Maj.General Thip Asawarak Commander of Patrol and Special Operations Division at that time had resurrected the special operation unit. He requested the Royal Thai Police department for the authorization of an international training plan for the special operation unit similar to GSG9 in Germany. Later in 1984, The Royal Thai Police department ordered the establishment  of a special operation unit within the Metropolitan Police Bureau, using the name of special operation unit  "Arintaraj 26"

Operations 
The company has been involved in a number of high-profile criminal cases, including:

1. Burmese student takeover of the Myanmar Embassy in Bangkok on 1–2 October 1999 (2542).

2. Takeover of the Ratchaburi Hospital in Ratchaburi Province on 24–25 January 2000 (2543).

3. Release of hostages from the Karen-Burmese rebellion at Samut Sakhon Province Prison on 22–23 November 2000 (2543).

4. Nakhon Ratchasima shootings on 8-9 February 2020 (2563), ( the operation was co-operated with other police units such as Naresuan 261 Counter-Terrorism Unit)

These four major successful operations were all under the control of Arintaraj 26. In all these situations, the mission was accomplished and the hostages were rescued.

Recruitment, selection and training 

Members of the Royal Thai police with at least two years of service, Freshmen who graduated from Police Academy and Freshmen who graduated from Police Cadet Academy can apply for the selection process of the Arintaraj 26. 

The test has the following:

 Medical examination
 Psychological examination
 Physical tests, which includes 1.6 km run, 100 m swim, sit up, pull-ups, push-ups, and obstacle course
 Final interview

The brutal 18 weeks training period includes eight weeks of basic training and ten weeks of special training. The identity of Arintaraj 26 units is classified as Royal Thai Police's final answer. Further training often involves co-operation with other allied counter-terrorism units such as Royal Thai Navy SEALs, RTAF Security Force Regiment, 90th Task Force, Naresuan 261. Only one in the third pass the training course.

Equipment 
Arintaraj 26 units are often equipped with specialized firearms including the Glock 17 pistols, Heckler & Koch MP5 submachine guns, M16 assault rifles, M4A1, Sig MPX, Remington 870 breaching shotguns, riot control agents, stun grenades, and sniper rifles such as HK PSG1, Remington M24. They also use specialized equipment including heavy body armor, ballistic shields, breaching tools, armored vehicles, advanced night vision optics, and motion detectors determine the positions of hostages or hostage takers inside to enclosed structures.

References

External links

 Patrol and Special operation Division (in Thai)

Law enforcement in Thailand
Special forces of Thailand
Non-military counterterrorist organizations
Royal Thai Police